Loona 1/3 (commonly stylized as LOONA 1/3 or LOOΠΔ 1/3) is the first sub-unit of South Korean girl group Loona, formed through a pre-debut project titled "Girl of the Month". The unit consists of 4 members, HeeJin, HyunJin, HaSeul, and ViVi. They debuted on March 13, 2017, with the extended play Love & Live.

History

Pre-debut: Revealing of the first three members 
The first member to be revealed is HeeJin on September 26, 2016. She debuted with her single album HeeJin with the title track "ViViD" on October 5. On October 28, HyunJin was revealed to be the second member. She debuted with her solo album titled HyunJin and the title track "Around You" on November 18. A duet between her and HeeJin, titled "I'll Be There", was also released, along with a music video. The next member, HaSeul, was revealed on December 8. She debuted through her single album of the same name HaSeul with the title track "Let Me In", released on December 15. Another track titled "The Carol" was released as well, with the three revealed members HeeJin, HyunJin and HaSeul.

2017-present: Debut with Love & Live, ViVi solo album, and Love & Evil 
On March 12, 2017, The sub-unit made their first live appearance on SBS's Inkigayo, performing both "You and Me Together" and "Love&Live". A day later, on March 13, they officially debuted with the release of their extended play Love & Live, featuring HeeJin, HyunJin, HaSeul and ViVi. On April 5, ViVi was officially revealed as the fifth member of Loona. Then, she released a solo album named ViVi with the title track "Everyday I Love You", featuring HaSeul, on April 17. The sub-unit supposedly cost 4 million dollars to produce, with the music video for their title track being filmed in New Zealand and Hong Kong.

A reissue of their extended play 'Love & Live, titled Love & Evil was released on April 27 with the addition of two tracks and the new lead single "Sonatine".

On January 13, 2023, it was announced that member HeeJin had won a lawsuit against agency BlockBerry Creative, which terminated her exclusive contract with the agency.

Members 
 HaSeul (하슬) (Leader)
 HeeJin (희진)
 HyunJin (현진)
 ViVi (비비)

Discography

Extended plays

Reissues

Singles

Videography

Music videos

References

Loona (group)
Musical groups established in 2017
2017 establishments in South Korea